Without Incident is a 1957 episode of Playhouse 90 starring Errol Flynn.

Plot
The captain of a U.S. Cavalry unit rescues two wives of slain traders who were being held hostage by hostile Native Americans but then is faced with a mutiny among his own men.

Cast
Errol Flynn as Captain Russell Bidlack
Anne Sheridan as Kathy
Julie London as Angela
John Ireland as Sgt Turley
Rodolfo Acosta

Production
Traditionally all shows on Playhouse 90 were made by Screen Gems and done live. However, in January 1957 CBS announced that three episodes would be made by another company, Filmaster Productions, and shot on location: "Carbine Web", "Lone Woman" and "Without Incident".

In February 1957 it was announced the episode may be spun off into a TV series starring Flynn but this did not happen.

Filming begun on location in Tucson, Arizona on March 4, with studio work in Hollywood.
 {Another account says filming started in Hollywood on 28 February and that the budget was around $150,000.) It was one of three Filmmaster productions being shot for Playhouse 90 in Arizona, the others being Lone Woman and Carbine Web. Each took around a week to film.

"I play a wonton," said Julie London.

Reception
Filmink magazine later wrote that this was "a different sort of character for" Flynn "a hated martinet who is willing to sacrifice the life of his men if it means keeping the Apaches at bay... it’s not one of his best performances, but the story is solid."

References

External links
Without Incident at IMDb

1957 American television episodes